Joseph Élie Georges-Marie Bonnet (17 March 1884 – 2 August 1944) was a French composer and organist.

Biography 
One of the major French pipe organists, Joseph Bonnet was born in Bordeaux. He first studied with his father, an organist at St. Eulalie. At the age of 14, he became official organist, first at St. Nicholas and almost immediately at St. Michael. Bonnet also attended classes with Alexandre Guilmant at the Conservatoire de Paris. A few years later he finished with a first prize and, in 1906 was selected to become the organist at St. Eustache, Paris. In 1911 he had the privilege of succeeding Guilmant as concert organist at the conservatoire. He was actively teaching at this time and one of his notable students from his earlier years was Canadian organist Henri Gagnon.

On 28 January 1917 he moved to the United States, where he gave more than 100 concerts around the country until 1919. He was elected an honorary member of Phi Mu Alpha Sinfonia music fraternity in June 1917. Bonnet founded the organ department of the Eastman School of Music in 1921. He composed a large number of organ pieces and compiled the six-volume Historical Organ Recitals.

A few years later, Bonnet returned to Paris, where Denise Restout attended one of his master classes in 1933. Four years later, he took Louis Vierne's position as organ teacher and specialist at L’École César-Franck.

In 1940, due to the outbreak of World War II, he was forced to leave France and returned to North America. He was organist at the Worcester Art Museum 1942-1943 and was appointed professor at the Conservatoire de musique du Québec à Montréal in 1943.  In Paris Bonnet had taught a student from Québec named Conrad Bernier who studied with him 1923-26, who eventually became one of the premier advocates of French organ music in the United States as both professor of organ and head of the Organ Department at Catholic University of America.

Bonnet died on 2 August 1944, while vacationing in St. Luce-sur-Mer, near Rimouski, Quebec. He is buried at the Benedictine Abbey of Saint-Benoît-du-Lac, near Magog (Québec).

Opus list

Sources
 William Self, For Mine Eyes Have Seen (Worcester, Massachusetts: Worcester Chapter of the American Guild of Organists, 1990)
 Norbert Durourcq, La musique d'orgue française, 1949

External links
Joseph Bonnet Association

Free scores
 
Poèmes d’automne: trois morceaux de concert ou de salon pour grand-orgue, op. 3 (From the Sibley Music Library Digital Score Collection) 
Variations de concert: pour grand-orgue, op 1 (From the Sibley Music Library Digital Score Collection) 
Historical organ-recitals: in six volumes / collected, edited and annotated by Joseph Bonnet (From the Sibley Music Library Digital Score Collection)

1884 births
1944 deaths
Musicians from Bordeaux
Conservatoire de Paris alumni
Academic staff of the Conservatoire de musique du Québec à Montréal
French classical organists
French male organists
French composers of sacred music
French male composers
20th-century organists
20th-century French male musicians
Male classical organists